María Laura Gómez Cabello (born 16 May 1993) is a Bolivian footballer who plays as a defender for Deportivo ITA and the Bolivia women's national team.

Early life
Gómez hails from the Tarija Department.

Club career
Gómez won the Bolivian football championship with San Martin in 2016. She scored a goal during the 2016 Copa Libertadores Femenina.

International career
Gómez played for Bolivia at senior level in two Copa América Femenina editions (2010 and 2018) and the 2014 South American Games.

References

1993 births
Living people
Women's association football defenders
Women's association football midfielders
Bolivian women's footballers
People from Tarija Department
Bolivia women's international footballers
Competitors at the 2014 South American Games